Freedom Force is a video game created by Sunsoft and released in 1988 for the Nintendo Entertainment System. In the game, the player takes the role of a sharpshooter in a counter-terrorist organization. Freedom Force was also one of the few NES games to require the NES Zapper light gun accessory. The game was released in arcades on the Nintendo Vs. System as Vs. Freedom Force.

Gameplay
Players assume the role of an anti-terrorist gunman who must kill terrorists without shooting any of their hostages. The game has different levels, including an airport that has been taken over by the terrorists and a city street. The game does have some blood, but it lacks gore; a small red splotch will appear on the chest of the targets that are hit.

The screen scrolls from left to right, with terrorists or hostages popping out of windows and doors. Unlike other shooters, the powerups (being either energy, ammo or weapons) are obtained by shooting the lower-right box when an item appears there.

After every two stages, a bonus game can be played for bonus points. This bonus game is a word game similar to Hangman, in which the player shoots letters to uncover the word. During this game, the player can have 5 misses. If the player gets 5 wrong letters or the timer runs out, the bonus game ends without any earned bonus points. If the word is completely revealed, the player gets a time bonus.

References

External links

1988 video games
Arcade video games
Sunsoft games
Light gun games
Nintendo Entertainment System games
Nintendo Vs. Series games
North America-exclusive video games
Multiplayer and single-player video games
Video games about terrorism
Video games developed in Japan
Video games developed in the United States
Video games scored by Naoki Kodaka